Montevecchio is one of the most ancient mining sites in Italy. The site is located in the south west of Sardinia, in the Province of South Sardinia. The village of Montevecchio (Gennas Serapis in Sardinian language) is a frazione of the municipality of Guspini, while the mines are situated in the municipalities of both Arbus and Guspini.

History
The extraction of minerals in the area of Montevecchio dates back to the Phoenician and Roman times. In 1842, modern industrial mining activity started in the area, thanks to the arrival of entrepreneurs such as Giovanni Antonio Pischedda and Giovanni Antonio Sanna. Subsequently, the Montecatini company took over the extractive activities. At its height, the mining village was inhabited by more than 3000 people. The mines of Montevecchio stopped their activities in 1991. The mines of Montevecchio are now an important site of industrial archaeology, part of the Parco Geominerario Storico ed Ambientale della Sardegna.

See also
 Guspini
 Arbus
 Costa Verde
 Province of South Sardinia

References

Footnotes

Bibliography
 Angei, Luca, Arbus tra storia e leggenda. Usanze e vita di un popolo, Cesmet, Napoli, 1995
 Caddeo, Antonello, Arbus. Immagini e ricordi dal passato, Editar, Cagliari, 1994
 Piras, Aldo, Pietro Leo e Raimondo Garau. Tempi e luoghi, Garau, Guspini, 2003

External links
 Montevecchio Mines
 Official Website of the Institution Parco Geominerario della Sardegna
 Official Website of the Medio Campidano Province (in English)

Province of South Sardinia
Buildings and structures in Sardinia
Mining in Italy
Tourist attractions in Sardinia
Museums in Sardinia
Mining museums